Salt Creek is a  intermittent stream in Riverside County, California, flowing into the north shore of the Salton Sea. Its discharge point is located north of Salt Creek Beach in the Salton Sea State Recreation Area. It is an important habitat of desert pupfish, containing a population of 159 fish. Salt creek is also a birding spot for birds that winter in the Salton Sea.

Sources

 

Rivers of Riverside County, California
Tributaries of the Salton Sea
Rivers of Southern California